Neoligia subjuncta is a species of cutworm or dart moth in the family Noctuidae. It is found in North America.

The MONA or Hodges number for Neoligia subjuncta is 9412.

References

Further reading

 
 
 
 

Noctuinae
Articles created by Qbugbot
Moths described in 1898